was the lead vessel in the   gunboats in the Imperial Japanese Navy, that operated in China during the 1940s.

History
Hashidate was authorized under the Maru-3 Naval Expansion Budget of 1937. She was laid down at Osaka Iron Works on February 20, 1939 and launched on December 23, 1939, and was commissioned into the Imperial Japanese Navy as on June 30, 1940.

She was intended initially for support of combat operations by the Imperial Japanese Army in the Second Sino-Japanese War off the coast of China. At the time of the attack on Pearl Harbor, Hashidate was assigned to the China Area Fleet as part of the 2nd China Expeditionary Fleet's 15th Escort Group. With the start of the Pacific War, she was assigned to ”Operation C” – the invasion of Hong Kong. She remained based at Hong Kong for most of the war. At some point in 1943, five additional Type 96 25 mm AT/AA Guns were added, along with depth charges in 1944.

Notes

References

External links

Hashidate-class gunboats
1939 ships
Second Sino-Japanese War naval ships of Japan
World War II naval ships of Japan
Ships sunk by American submarines
Maritime incidents in May 1944
World War II shipwrecks in the South China Sea
Ships built by Osaka Iron Works